The C44 is a gravel road in central Namibia. Its western terminus is at the B8 north of Grootfontein. There are plans to upgrade this road to bitumen.

References

Roads in Namibia
Otjozondjupa Region